Group B of the 1992 Federation Cup Europe/Africa Zone was one of four pools in the Europe/Africa zone of the 1992 Federation Cup. Four teams competed in a round robin competition, with the top two teams advancing to the knockout stage.

Croatia vs. Greece

Portugal vs. Turkey

Croatia vs. Turkey

Greece vs. Portugal

Croatia vs. Portugal

Greece vs. Turkey

See also
Fed Cup structure

References

External links
 Fed Cup website

1992 Federation Cup Europe/Africa Zone